The Hell of Barballo (German: Die Hölle von Barballo) is a 1923 Austrian silent drama film directed by Hans Homma and starring Grit Haid, Hilde Schulz and Albert von Kersten.

Cast
 Grit Haid
 Hilde Schulz
 Pauline Schweighofer
 Albert von Kersten
 Peer Andersen
 Louis Nerz
 Viktor Franz
 Marek Martoff
 Alexander Polonsky

References

Bibliography
 Paolo Caneppele & Günter Krenn. Elektrische Schatten. Filmarchiv Austria, 1999.
 Ryan Shand, Small-Gauge Storytelling: Discovering the Amateur Fiction Film: Discovering the Amateur Fiction Film. Edinburgh University Press, 2013.

External links

1923 films
Austrian silent feature films
Films directed by Hans Homma
Austrian black-and-white films